EPODE International Network (EIN) is a not for profit, non-governmental organisation that seeks to support childhood obesity-prevention programmes across the world, via best practice sharing and capacity building.

The name EPODE comes from ‘Ensemble Prévenons l'ObésitéDes Enfants’ Together Let's Prevent Childhood Obesity

The EPODE International Network (EIN), is a Nonprofit organization, and is a contribution to the response to the need and demand from the global community in the fight against childhood obesity and Non-communicable diseases (NCDs), through sustainable and large-sale Community Based Programmes (CBPs) for childhood obesity prevention.

In light of the encouraging experiences and results of the EPODE methodology  (Towns in Belgium that implemented the program saw a 22 per cent decrease in overweight children), the EPODE International Network, was created in 2011 as a response to the global demand for action concerning the increasing international prevalence of overweight and obesity and the related non-communicable diseases. The EPODE International Network works to promote and enhance the global movement to prevent childhood obesity by supporting Community Based Programmes (CBPs) for childhood obesity prevention through sustainable and large-sale strategies that mobilise a multi-stakeholder dynamic.

General Organisation of EPODE International Network

The EPODE International Network is an NGO, a network of community-based and school-based childhood obesity-prevention programmes as well as healthy active initiatives aimed at preventing childhood adiposity & overweight in children. This NGO facilitates the  sharing of experiences, best practices and tools at the global level for continuous improvement and strengthening of its members. EIN also endeavours to ensure the sustainability of CBPs, SBPs & HAIs over time, contributing to the global movement to reduce and prevent childhood overweight and obesity.

The network is coordinated by a dedicated unit and is supported by 3 platforms, gathering a broad diversity of actors:
 A Scientific Board and Platform, with 18 internationally recognized experts in the fields of nutrition and physical activity to provide scientific guidance for the implementation and evaluation processes to prevent childhood obesity.
 A Ministers’ Club, gathering Ministers, State Secretaries, members of Parliament and Mayors to raise awareness on the childhood obesity issue and to advocate for a strong and sustainable political involvement in the development of CBPs, SBPs & HAIs around the world.
 A Public-Private Partnership Platform, linking representatives of the civil society, corporate sector, NGOs and institutions to stimulate multistakeholder, concerted and coordinated partnerships supporting the implementation of CBPs around the world.

In addition, the EPODE International Network holds regional and global forums which represent a call for global perspectives, solutions and commitments to solve the obesity and NCDs crisis worldwide.

Objectives

EPODE International Network’s overall objective is to build international capacity and capability for multipartner community-based childhood obesity-prevention programmes (CBPs) in countries by:

 Facilitating best practice sharing between EIN member childhood obesity-prevention programmes
 Providing EIN members visibility at global level
 Gathering leading political representatives to place and maintain childhood obesity prevention at the top of agendas
 Gathering the leading global experts to build greater scientific and field evidence in preventing obesity in children and overweight kids
 Forging links for greater dialogue between all stakeholders from Public, Civic and Private Sectors (civil society, corporate sector, institutions)

The EPODE International Network has more than 30 childhood obesity-prevention programme members in over 20 countries. By 2015 EPODE International Network will involve more than 400,000,000 people worldwide.

Activities

In order to support its member childhood obesity-prevention programmes, the EIN organises regional and global meetings in order to facilitate best practice sharing and hold capacity building workshops, specific to the needs of its members. The EIN Scientific Advisory Board is also active in providing key support to members of the network in numerous ways, and notably providing valuable evaluation support and assisting programme members with the publication of their results.

Some activities include attempts to curb fast-food outlets near schools.

In France, Fleurbaix-Laventie Ville Santé (FLVS), a food and nutrition project, were taken up by 10 mid-sized French towns as part of a wider pilot scheme, EPODE, aimed at preventing obesity among five to 12-year-olds.

Network members

The following countries around the world are members of the EPODE International Network:
 Belgium – Viasano
 Bulgaria – Healthy Kids
 France – Epode
 Greece – Paideiatrofi
 Israel – Healthy Living
 Italy - Eurobis
An EPODE Umbria Region Obesity Intervention Study reveals the Umbria region has now reached the alarming prevalence of 36% obesity in children 
 Netherlands – Jogg
 Poland – Keep Fit
 Portugal – Munsi
 Romania – Sets
 Romania – Healthy Traditions
 Slovakia – Sporttube
 Spain – Thao
 United Kingdom – Phunkyfoods
 United Kingdom – Beat The Street
 Brazil – Agita Sao Paulo
 Canada – Real Food For Real Kid
 Chile – Elige Vivir Sano
 Mexico - Muevete Y Metete En Cintura
 Mexico - Colima - 5 Pasos Por Tu Salud Para Vivir Mejor
 Mexico - Hidalgo - Ya Bájale
 Mexico -  Sonora-  5 Pasos - Sonora
 Mexico -  Aguascalientes 2 - 5 Pasos Por Un Aguascalientes Saludable
 Mexico - Puebla - 5 Pasos Por Tu Salud En Familia
 Mexico - Durango - Atrevete Vive Saludable En 5 Pasos
 Mexico - Aguascalientes - 5 Pasos Por Tu Salud
 Mexico - Montemorelos - Montemorelos Adelante Con 5 Pasos
 Mexico - Edomex 5 Pasos - Control De Peso En Capulhuac
 United States- World Fit 
 Australia – Opal
 Australia – Pcm
 New Zealand – Energize
 Taiwan – Health Promotion
 Singapore – Health Promotion

EPODE Ministers' Club
The EIN Ministers’ Club  facilitates personal relationships between elected representatives from EPODE Programmes and existing community-based programmes from international regions or countries interested in developing obesity-prevention strategies. Members of the Ministers’ Club includes elected representatives such as ministers and secretaries (health, sports, urbanism, education, agriculture…), members of parliaments, governors, and mayors of cities involved in community-based childhood obesity-prevention programs.

EPODE Ministers' Club leadership
 José Ángel Córdova  President of EPODE Ministers' Club - 2013
 John Hill (Australian politician)

See also
 Bariatrics
 Childhood obesity
 Classification of childhood obesity
 Obesity and walking
 Social stigma of obesity
 World Fit - A program of the United States Olympic Committee (USOC), and the United States Olympians and Paralympians Association (USOP)
 Bioelectrical impedance analysis – A method to measure body fat percentage.

Bibliography

References

External links 
 EPODE International Network 

2011 establishments in Belgium
Medical and health organisations based in Belgium
Obesity organizations
International medical and health organizations
Physical exercise